"Losing You" is a song written by Jean Renard and Carl Sigman and performed by Brenda Lee.  The song reached #2 on the adult contemporary chart, #6 on the Billboard Hot 100, #10 in the UK, and #13 on the R&B chart in 1963.  The song is featured on her 1963 album, ..."Let Me Sing".

The song was produced by Owen Bradley.  The single's B-side, "He's So Heavenly", reached #93 on the Billboard Hot 100.

The song was ranked #62 on Billboard magazine's Top Hot 100 songs of 1963.

Other versions
Doris Day released a version on her 1963 album, Love Him.
Bobby Russell released a version as the B-side to his 1963 single, "Still".
Lale Andersen released a German version called Grau war der Ozean (Grey Was the Ocean) on a single in 1963.
Orietta Berti released a version as part of an EP in 1964 entitled "Perdendoti".
Al Martino released a version as part of an EP in 1964.
Nora Aunor released a version on her 1971 album, The Song of My Life.
Alison Krauss released a version as the lead single from her 2017 solo album, Windy City.

Charts

References

1963 songs
1963 singles
Songs written by Carl Sigman
Brenda Lee songs
Doris Day songs
Al Martino songs
Decca Records singles
Songs written by Jean Renard (songwriter)